Aretha's Gold is a greatest hits album by Aretha Franklin, released in 1969 at Atlantic Recording Corporation. The album's tracks were recorded at Atlantic Studios, New York City, except "I Never Loved a Man (The Way I Love You)" and "Do Right Woman, Do Right Man," which were recorded at the Fame Recording Studios, Muscle Shoals, Alabama.

The album was included in Robert Christgau's "Basic Record Library" of 1950s and 1960s recordings, published in Christgau's Record Guide: Rock Albums of the Seventies (1981).

Track listing
Side One
"I Never Loved a Man (The Way I Love You)" (Ronnie Shannon) - 2:47
"Do Right Woman, Do Right Man" (Dan Penn, Chips Moman) - 3:15
"Respect" (Otis Redding) - 2:26
"Dr. Feelgood" (Franklin, Ted White) - 3:18
"Baby, I Love You" (Ronnie Shannon) - 2:39
"(You Make Me Feel Like) A Natural Woman" (Gerry Goffin, Carole King & Jerry Wexler) - 2:37
"Chain of Fools" (Don Covay) - 2:45

Side Two
"(Sweet Sweet Baby) Since You've Been Gone" (Franklin, White) - 2:18
"Ain't No Way" (Carolyn Franklin, White) - 4:12
"Think" (Franklin, White) - 2:15
"You Send Me" (Sam Cooke) - 2:25
"The House That Jack Built" (Bob Lance, Fran Robins) - 2:18
"I Say a Little Prayer" (Burt Bacharach, Hal David) - 3:30
"See Saw" (Steve Cropper, Covay) - 4:42

Personnel 

Aretha Franklin – piano, vocals

Certifications

See also
List of number-one R&B albums of 1969 (U.S.)

References

1969 greatest hits albums
Aretha Franklin compilation albums
Atlantic Records compilation albums
Atlantic Records albums